Cavagnaro is a surname. Notable people with the surname include:

Carlos Cavagnaro (born 1946), Argentine football manager
Catherine Cavagnaro (born 1965), American mathematician and aviator
Osvaldo Cavagnaro (born 1938), Argentine rower